Scopula argyroleuca is a moth of the family Geometridae. It was described by George Hampson in 1910. It is found in Kenya and Zambia.

References

Moths described in 1910
argyroleuca
Taxa named by George Hampson
Moths of Africa